The 1st People's Choice Awards, honoring the best in popular culture for 1974, was held in 1975 and broadcast on CBS.

Presenters
Richard Crenna
Army Archerd
Bob Hope
Lynn Anderson
Jimmy Cohn
Jacqueline Bisset
Brenda Vaccaro
Sammy Davis Jr.
Raquel Welch
Faye Dunaway
Alan Alda
Barbra Streisand
Carol Burnett
Michael Landon
Wayne Rogers
Ted Knight
Shirley Jones
Ann-Margret
Natalie Wood
Robert Wagner
Dyan Cannon
Danny Thomas
Valerie Braun
George Segal
Cher

Awards
Winners are listed first, in bold.

Movies

Television

Music

Others

References

People's Choice Awards
1974 awards
1975 in American television
1974 awards in the United States
March 1975 events in the United States